Halssila is one of the districts of Jyväskylä, Finland, located about three kilometers to east from the city center. As of December 2020, the population of Halssila was 6,123.

History 
Halssila started to develop in the 1920s when factor workers started to build houses in the area. It was merged into Jyväskylä in 1941. Halssila was known as a working-class district, but the reputation started to change in the 1960s after the area started to grow faster and the old labour movement became to fade away. In the 1970s the construction of new neighborhoods, mainly made of apartment buildings, was started. During the 2000s and 2010s other new neighborhoods  were constructed.

Subareas 
Halssila consists several subareas, which are Tuohimutka, Aholaita, Aittorinne, Halssilanmäki, Halssilanranta, Kivistö, Halssilanrinne and Rauhalahti.

Notable people 

 Sofi Oksanen (born 1977), writer

 Erkki Pajala (1929–1992), actor
 Sami Vatanen (born 1991), ice hockey player

Gallery

References 

Neighbourhoods of Jyväskylä